Thomas Obi (born 1932) is a Nigerian sprinter. He competed in the men's 100 metres at the 1956 Summer Olympics. He finished second in the 1958 British Empire and Commonwealth Games 4×110 yards Relay (with Jimmy Omagbemi, Smart Akraka, and the non-Olympian Victor Odofin). At the 1958 British Empire and Commonwealth Games Obi was eliminated in the semi-finals of the 120 yards hurdles and in the quarter-finals of the 100 yards.

References

External links
 

1932 births
Living people
Athletes (track and field) at the 1956 Summer Olympics
Nigerian male hurdlers
Nigerian male sprinters
Olympic athletes of Nigeria
Commonwealth Games silver medallists for Nigeria
Commonwealth Games medallists in athletics
Athletes (track and field) at the 1958 British Empire and Commonwealth Games
Place of birth missing (living people)
20th-century Nigerian people
Medallists at the 1958 British Empire and Commonwealth Games